The Conant Brook Dam is located on Conant Brook in Monson, Massachusetts, about  upstream from the confluence of Conant Brook and the Quaboag River.

Designed and constructed by the United States Army Corps of Engineers, this dam substantially reduces flooding along the Quaboag, Chicopee, and Connecticut rivers. Construction of the project began in 1964 with completion in 1966 at a cost of US$2,950,530.

The Conant Brook Dam is located within the Chicopee River watershed and is part of the Connecticut River basin. Access to the site is available from State Route 32 and State Route 19.

Description
Cut in rock, the spillway comprises a concrete weir  in width. The weir's crest elevation is 14 feet (7.0 m) lower than the top of the dam. There is no permanent lake behind the dam.

Land use and recreation
The Army Corps of Engineers manages and preserves the land for flood control and passive recreation. In addition,  of service roads (closed to motor vehicles) cross the reservoir area and are open to non-motorized use. The main entrance and parking area are located on Wales Road in Monson, approx.  east of State Route 32. An information kiosk is located here. Limited trailhead parking is also available at the gated ends of East Hill Road and Waterworks Road, and at the north end of the project off Munn Road, near the east end of the dike.

Camping is not permitted.

References 
 Conant Brook Dam website, Army Corps of Engineers

Dams in Massachusetts
Buildings and structures in Hampden County, Massachusetts
United States Army Corps of Engineers dams
Dams completed in 1966